Sean Edward Miller (born November 17, 1968) is an American college basketball coach who currently serves as head coach of the Xavier Musketeers. He previously was in that position from 2004 to 2009, after which he took the head coach position for the Arizona Wildcats, which he held until being fired in 2021. 

Miller is a three-time gold medalist as a member of USA Basketball: once as a player, once as an assistant coach, and once as head coach. Miller has won five league Coach of the Year Awards: once in the A10, three in the Pac-12, and once as USA Basketball Coach of the Year.

Playing career

Early years
Miller was born in Ellwood City, Pennsylvania. The son of John Miller, a Pennsylvania high school basketball coach, Miller was a point guard under his father at Blackhawk High School in Chippewa Township, Beaver County, Pennsylvania. He had developed considerable ballhandling skills before that time and appeared on The Tonight Show Starring Johnny Carson when he was fourteen years old. His ball handling skills were such that he was featured in the 1979 movie The Fish That Saved Pittsburgh, starring basketball star Julius Erving.
In his junior year, he led Blackhawk to the 1986 Western Pennsylvania Interscholastic Athletic League (WPIAL) title. In his senior year, he averaged 27 points and 11 assists per game and helped lead his Blackhawk Cougars to the 1987 WPIAL championship game. After graduation, he chose to play basketball for Pittsburgh.

University of Pittsburgh
Miller played at Pitt from 1987 to 1992.  Despite being a true freshman, he was the starting point guard.  Some of his more famous teammates at the time include Charles Smith and Jerome Lane.  Many of his teammates recall his knowledge of the game and his leadership qualities. His knowledge of the game allowed him to compete at this level, although he did not have the speed or athleticism of his peers. Jason Matthews, the shooting guard next to Miller, recalls he was the leader of the team, even as a freshman, and that the upperclassmen welcomed him as a leader.  Because of his knowledge and leadership abilities, none of his teammates were surprised once he became a top coach in NCAA men's basketball.  Miller's collegiate statistics are: 128 games played, 1,282 points, 10.0 points per game, 744 assists, 5.8 assists per game, 261 rebounds, 2.0 rebounds per game, and 102 steals.

Sean was on the all-Rookie team for the Big East. As of the 2009–2010 season, he was the No. 17 all-time scorer for Pitt, all-time best three-point shooter for Pitt, and had the third most Big East career assists.  Furthermore, he ranked 10th among career Division I free throw shooters at .885.

Coaching career

Early years
After graduating from Pitt with a degree in communications in 1992, Miller took a graduate assistant position at Wisconsin. He then spent two seasons (1993–95) at Miami (Ohio) under Herb Sendek, during which the team made two postseason appearances. He then returned to his alma mater of Pittsburgh for a season as an assistant under Ralph Willard.

In 1996, Miller rejoined Sendek at North Carolina State. In Miller's five years in Raleigh, the Wolfpack made four postseason appearances, including a run into the 2000 NIT semifinals.

Miller's next move was a return to southwestern Ohio in 2001. This time, he would join Thad Matta's staff at Xavier as the first associate head coach in the school's history. The Musketeers won 26 games in each of Miller's three seasons under Matta, making the NCAA tournament each season. The 2004 season was especially notable. First, the Musketeers won the Atlantic 10 postseason tournament despite having to play four games to do so. Xavier then made a deep run in the subsequent NCAA tournament, finishing with the school's first-ever appearance in the Elite Eight.

Xavier
Taking over as head coach at Xavier after Matta moved on to Ohio State, Miller took the Musketeers to four NCAA tournaments, in addition to winning three A-10 regular season championships and one conference tournament championship. In the 2008 NCAA tournament, the 3rd seeded Musketeers were eliminated in the Elite Eight by #1 seed UCLA, while in 2009, they were eliminated in the Sweet 16 by another #1 seed, Pittsburgh.

Arizona
After the tournament, Miller was announced to be a possible candidate for the vacant head coaching position at Arizona, which had spent two years under interim head coaches in the wake of the illness and retirement of Hall of Fame coach Lute Olson. He initially turned the job down before changing his mind and accepting the job on April 6, 2009, despite having never visited the Arizona campus. He was succeeded at Xavier by former assistant Chris Mack. Within three months of joining the program, Miller had already assembled a recruiting class ranked #12 in the nation by Scout.com. Miller led Arizona to a 16–15 record (10–8 in the Pacific-10 Conference) in his debut season, and the Wildcats missed postseason play for the first time in 25 years.

In the 2010-11 season, Miller guided Arizona back to college basketball relevance. He led Arizona to its first top 10 ranking in the AP poll since January 8, 2007, and led the Wildcats to their first outright Pac-10 Regular Season Title (its 12th overall), 4th 30+ win season (1st overall), 2nd Elite Eight appearance (9th overall) and its highest coaches poll finish (9th) since the 2004–2005 season. Miller compiled a recruiting class that included 4 ESPNU top 100 recruits (#4 by Scout.com), which was widely regarded as a top ten recruiting class. In addition, Miller led the Wildcats to their first unbeaten home record (17–0) in 14 years and was named Pac-10 Coach of the Year. This was the first time an Arizona coach received this honor since Lute Olson did in 2003. The 17 consecutive home win streak tied for the second most in school history and is part of a 19-game home streak beginning in the 2009–2010 season. Miller's recruiting has improved. From not being ranked in the top-25 recruiting classes by ESPN in 2010, Miller would add to the season's success by guiding the Cats to their first Elite Eight appearance since the 2004–2005 Season as a 5-seed. In the second round, Arizona secured a 2-point victory over 12th seeded Memphis (coached by former Wildcat (and member of the 1997 national title team) Josh Pastner) with a blocked shot in the final seconds by Derrick Williams. Arizona would follow with another close game—a controversial one-point win against 4-seed Texas.
In the Sweet-16 match-up, Arizona found itself pitted against top-seeded Duke, the first time since the 2001 title game that the two schools had met. Duke would extend an early lead, but 25 points from Derrick Williams kept the Cats in the game and down by 6 points at the half. In the second half, Williams' teammates picked up the slack, dominating the Blue Devils by scoring 55 second-half points and routing the defending champs 93–77. Arizona's run at the Final Four would fall 2 points short, losing to 3-seed (and eventual national champion) Connecticut 65–63.

For 2011–12's third season, Arizona's 2011 recruiting class was ranked 7th, notably signing Nick Johnson and Josiah Turner.  Arizona secured three players in the top nine of the ESPNU 100, with all four newly signed players in the top 36. This cemented Arizona as the No. 1 signing class nationally, surpassing Kentucky who held the No. 1 spot 2010 and 2011. The Wildcats missed the postseason for the second time, reached to the NIT Tournament before falling to Bucknell to finish the season 23–12 overall, 12–6 in Pac-12.

In his fourth season, Miller guided the Wildcats to their second top-5 ranking in the AP poll (the first coming in weeks 7–10 of the 2012–2013 season). Arizona reached the Sweet 16 in the 2013 NCAA tournament before falling to Ohio State and finished the season with an overall record of 27–8 and 12–6 in Pac-12.

On December 9, 2013, in Miller's fifth season as head coach of the Wildcats, Arizona became the #1 ranked team in the country for the 6th time in school history following a 9–0 start with wins over traditional national powerhouses Duke and UNLV. The Wildcats followed this up by securing a key come-from-behind victory on the road at Michigan on December 14 and led the Wildcats to their second outright Pac-12 regular season title (its 13th overall, 26th regular season overall). Arizona also secured its second unbeaten home record (18–0) and Coach Miller was again named the Pac-10/12 coach of the year. The Wildcats completed their fifth ever 30+ win season (2nd overall). In the NCAA tournament, Arizona made its second Elite Eight appearance (9th overall) of the Miller era, but fell to Wisconsin in overtime to finish the season with an overall record of 33–5, including 15–3 in Pac-12.

After Gonzaga's home loss to BYU on February 28, 2015, Arizona claimed the longest active home winning streak in D-I men's college basketball. Arizona defeated #13 Utah in Salt Lake City the same day, winning its share of the Pac-12 regular season title. After three losses to Pac-12 arch-rival Arizona State, Oregon State, and UNLV, Arizona won their third outright Pac-12 regular season championship title under Miller's leadership (Arizona's 14th Pac-12 regular season title, and 27th conference title overall). The Wildcats completed their sixth ever 30+ win season (3rd under Miller) and won their first Pac-12 Tournament title (5th overall) since 2002. In the 2015 NCAA tournament, the Wildcats would fall to Wisconsin for the second consecutive year in the Elite Eight, 85–78, finishing the season with a 34–4 record overall, 16–2 in Pac-12.

During the 2016–2017 he signed an extension through the 2022 season as the head coach of the Arizona Wildcats. Miller has the 4th best conference winning percentage of any coach with at least 100 conference wins percentage() only behind John Wooden, Lute Olson & Jim Harrick.  He is tied for 20th in career conference victories at 107.  On March 6, Miller won his 3rd Pac-12 Coach of the Year honor, second most in school history.  Miller's Wildcats finished the Pac-12 regular season with a record of 27–4 plus a 16–2 in conference play which was good enough for co-champions 15th in school history & 2 seed in the Pac-12 tournament.  They went on to defeat 7 seed Colorado, 3 seed Ucla & overall 1 seed Oregon for the Pac-12 Conference Championship, its 6th in school history and second under Miller.  During the NCAA Selection process Miller and the Wildcats received a 2 seed in the West Region.  They defeated 15 seed North Dakota 100–62 to reach the round of 32, 7 seed Saint Mary's 69–60 to reach the schools 19th sweet 16 where they lost to 11 seed Xavier in the West regional Semi-Final in San Jose, 71–73.

Miller has the most wins and best winning percentage in a 4-year span currently at 124 wins, while only losing 22 games for a  winning percentage.  Miller is currently the winningest coach in the Pac-12, with a 76.9% winning percentage and an average of more than 27 wins a season at the end of his 8th season at Arizona. Miller served as head coach for four of the seven seasons in Arizona history in which the team has won 30 or more games.  His tenure at Arizona includes three undefeated home seasons and the second longest home winning streak (49 games) in McKale Center history. Arizona is one of three Power 5 schools to win more than 25 games each season each of the last five seasons, joined by Duke and Kansas.

Miller has helped to improve the University of Arizona's facilities, overseeing an $80 million renovation to the McKale Center, and the opening of the Cole and Jeannie Davis Strength and Conditioning Center at the Richard Jefferson Gymnasium—partly financed by a sizable donation from the Miller family.

He was the subject of an investigation related to the 2017 NCAA basketball corruption scandal regarding offers to illegally pay athletes for attending his school, including 2017 recruit and future #1 2018 NBA draft pick Deandre Ayton. On February 24, 2018, Miller would not be allowed to coach the upcoming game against Oregon, with coaching instead going to Lorenzo Romar that game.  On March 1, Miller denied any allegations against him and was reinstated as Arizona's head coach.

Miller began his 10th season as the Arizona head coach during the 2018–2019 season.  After a victory against UTEP, Miller recorded his 250th win for Arizona (370th win overall), in only 324 games, which is the 5th fastest of any coach at any Division 1 program all-time. Arizona ended the season 17−15, missing the NCAA tournament for only the 3rd time in the previous 34 seasons.

Miller would enter his 11th season at Arizona with yet another top 5 recruiting class & preseason ranked #21 in the AP poll.  After defeating Wake Forest to win the Wooden Legacy, Arizona began the season 9−0.  With a win over USC on February 6, Miller would win his 400th game in only 542 games, which was 22nd fastest.

After 12 seasons as head coach, Miller was fired by Arizona on April 7, 2021.  On December 14th, the IARP ruled in the 2017–18 NCAA Division I men's basketball corruption scandal Arizona & Miller were forced to vacate all regular-season, conference and NCAA Tournament wins in which Alkins competed during 2016-17 and 2017-18, plus the two exhibition games in Spain in August 2017 that Pinder played in. It reduced Arizona’s record from 32-5 to 0-5 in 2016-17 and from 27-8 to 9-8 in 2017-18, when former guard Rawle Alkins played in 18 games.  Miller would vacate 50 wins in his coaching record wherever he coaches collegiately.

Xavier (2nd stint) 
Miller was hired by Xavier on March 19, 2022, after having last coached at the school in 2009.

USA Basketball
Miller served as the head coach of the USA men's Under-19 junior national team, which competed at the 2015 FIBA Under-19 World Championship. The USA team ended up with a perfect 7–0 record and a gold medal. As a result of this performance, Miller was named the co-national coach of the year by USA basketball.  He was replaced in 2017 by close friend John Calipari as the head coach, ending his 2-year run.

Personal life
Miller and his wife, Amy, have three sons. His brother, Archie Miller, is the men's basketball head coach at Rhode Island.

Head coaching record

 

<small> The NCAA vacated 32 wins from the 2016–17 season, and 18 wins from the 2017–18 season as a result of the 2017–18 NCAA men's basketball corruption scandal.  The players involved in the scandal played in every game in the 2016–17 & 23 games in the 2017–18 season, resulting in a 9–8 record.

References

External links

 Arizona Wildcats bio

1968 births
Living people
American men's basketball coaches
American men's basketball players
Arizona Wildcats men's basketball coaches
Basketball coaches from Pennsylvania
Basketball players from Pennsylvania
College men's basketball head coaches in the United States
Miami RedHawks men's basketball coaches
NC State Wolfpack men's basketball coaches
People from Ellwood City, Pennsylvania
Pittsburgh Panthers men's basketball coaches
Pittsburgh Panthers men's basketball players
Point guards
Wisconsin Badgers men's basketball coaches
Xavier Musketeers men's basketball coaches